The Two Sides of Mary Wells is the seventh studio album by soul singer Mary Wells, released on the Atco label in 1966. By now, Wells' career had drastically changed from just six years before when the then-teenage Wells first recorded songs for Motown. After being promised a movie deal with 20th Century Fox, Wells had left Motown for the label in 1965 only to find herself struggling to get radio airplay. Rumors were that Motown staff, particularly Berry Gordy, told radio deejays not to play Wells' music on the radio leading to a blacklisting of Wells' music. This album mixed traditional pop with more earthier and uptown soul songs. Wells released a modest hit with the Motown-esque "Dear Lover", which hit the top ten of the R&B chart.

Track listing

Side one
"Satisfaction" (Mick Jagger, Keith Richards)
"Love Makes the World Go Round" (Deon Jackson)
"In the Midnight Hour" (Steve Cropper, Wilson Pickett)
"My World Is Empty Without You" (Holland-Dozier-Holland)
"Good Lovin'" (Arthur Resnick, Rudy Clark)
"Dear Lover" (Carl Davis, Gerald Sims)

Side two
"Where Am I Going" (Cy Coleman, Dorothy Fields)
"Shangri-La" (Carl Sigman, Matty Malneck, Robert Maxwell)
"On a Clear Day (You Can See Forever)" (Alan Jay Lerner, Burton Lane)
"The Shadow of Your Smile" (Johnny Mandel, Paul Francis Webster)
"The Boy from Ipanema" (Antônio Carlos Jobim, Norman Gimbel, Vinicius de Moraes)
"Sunrise, Sunset" (Jerry Bock, Sheldon Harnick)

Personnel
Bob Kidder - engineer
Sonny Sanders - arranger on Side one
Joe Mazzu - arranger on Side two
Gerald Sims - conductor

Mary Wells albums
1966 albums
Atco Records albums